Francisco Núñez Melián (died 13 April 1644) was a Spanish adventurer and royal administrator.

In 1626, he led an expedition to locate the wrecks of the two ships Nuestra Señora de Atocha and Santa Margarita. On 3 June 1626 one of his slaves, Casta Bañon, discovered the wreck of Santa Margarita.

He was Governor of Venezuela from 1630 to 1637. Between 1643 and 1644 he was Governor of Yucatán, appointed by Philip IV of Spain. He died while in office on 13 April 1644.

References

External links
 The Melian Document

Governors of Yucatán (state)
1644 deaths
Royal Governors of Venezuela
Year of birth unknown